The Cathedral of Our Merciful Saviour in Faribault is the oldest cathedral in Minnesota. Built 1862–1869, it was the first church in the Episcopal Church in the United States of America designed as a cathedral.  The architect was James Renwick Jr., who also designed St. Patrick's Cathedral in New York, the Smithsonian Institution Building in Washington, D.C., and a very similar church, the Christ Church by the Sea in Colón, Panama. On August 10, 1979, the cathedral and its guild house were added to the National Register of Historic Places. On February 19, 1982, there was a boundary increase to add the bishop's residence to the National Register.

Our Merciful Saviour was founded by Bishop Henry Benjamin Whipple, who is buried beneath the altar. In 1941 St. Mark's Episcopal Cathedral in Minneapolis was dedicated as the seat of the bishop for the Episcopal Diocese of Minnesota, but the Cathedral of Our Merciful Saviour retains its status as a full cathedral as well.

National Register listings

Original
Cathedral of Our Merciful Saviour **
(added 1979 - Building - #79001253)
Also known as See Also: Cathedral of Our Merciful Saviour and Guild House
515 2nd Ave., NW, Faribault
Historic Significance: 	Event, Architecture/Engineering
Architect, builder, or engineer: 	Renwick & Co.
Architectural Style: 	Gothic Revival
Area of Significance: 	Architecture, Religion
Period of Significance: 	1850-1874
Owner: 	Private
Historic Function: 	Religion
Historic Sub-function: 	Religious Structure
Current Function: 	Religion
Current Sub-function: 	Religious Structure

Boundary increase

Cathedral of Our Merciful Saviour and Guild House (Boundary Increase) **
(added 1982 - Building - #82003009)
Also known as See Also:Cathedral of Our Merciful Saviour
515 2nd Ave., NW, Faribault
Historic Significance: 	Person, Event, Architecture/Engineering
Architect, builder, or engineer: 	Unknown
Architectural Style: 	Late Victorian
Historic Person: 	Whipple, Bishop Henry Benjamin
Significant Year: 	1894
Area of Significance: 	Architecture, Religion
Period of Significance: 	1875-1899
Owner: 	Private
Historic Function: 	Religion
Historic Sub-function: 	Church Related Residence
Current Function: 	Religion
Current Sub-function: 	Church Related Residence

See also

List of the Episcopal cathedrals of the United States
List of cathedrals in the United States

References

Alan K. Lathrop. Churches of Minnesota: an Illustrated Guide. University of Minnesota Press. Minneapolis: 2003.

External links
Cathedral of Our Saviour website
Episcopal Diocese of Minnesota website

19th-century Episcopal church buildings
Buildings and structures in Faribault, Minnesota
Cathedrals in Minnesota
Churches completed in 1869
Churches in Rice County, Minnesota
Our Merciful Saviour
Episcopal church buildings in Minnesota
James Renwick Jr. church buildings
Churches on the National Register of Historic Places in Minnesota
1869 establishments in Minnesota
National Register of Historic Places in Rice County, Minnesota